Allorchestes is a genus of amphipods with relatively small gnathopods,  in the family Dogielinotidae; it contains the following species:
 Allorchestes angusta Dana, 1856
 Allorchestes bellabella J. L. Barnard, 1974
 Allorchestes carinata Iwasa, 1939
 Allorchestes compressa Dana, 1852
 Allorchestes hirsutus Ishimaru, 1995
 Allorchestes inquirendus K. H. Barnard, 1940
 Allorchestes malleola Stebbing, 1899
 Allorchestes novizealandiae Dana, 1852
 Allorchestes priceae Hendrycks & Bousfield, 2001
 Allorchestes rickeri Hendrycks & Bousfield, 2001

References

External links

Gammaridea